An onion ring, also called a French fried onion ring, is a form of appetizer or side dish in British and American cuisine. They generally consist of a cross-sectional "ring" of onion dipped in batter or bread crumbs and then deep fried; a variant is made with onion paste. While typically served as a side dish, onion rings are often eaten by themselves.

History

A British recipe from 1802 calls for cutting onions into slices, dipping them into a batter, adding Parmesan cheese, and deep frying them in lard. It suggests serving them with a sauce of melted butter and mustard.

Recipes for and references to deep-fried battered onion slices or rings are found across the 20th century: one in Middletown, New York in 1910; another in a 1933 advertisement for Crisco. 

Various restaurants claimed to have invented onion rings, including the Kirby's Pig Stand restaurant chain, founded in Oak Cliff, Texas in the early 1920s.

Food chemistry

The cooking process decomposes propanethial oxide in the onion into the sweet-smelling and tasting bispropenyl disulfide, responsible for the slightly sweet taste of onion rings.

See also

 Blooming onion – a whole onion that is cut into a flower shape that fans out
 Fried onions
 Funyuns – an onion flavored, corn based snack food, shaped like onion rings
 List of deep fried foods
 List of hors d'oeuvre
 List of onion dishes

References

External links

Fast food
Onion-based foods
Appetizers
Deep fried foods
British cuisine
Cuisine of the Southern United States
American vegetable dishes